Rena Golden (née Rena Shaheen Zeya; March 30, 1961 – March 20, 2013) was an Indian-born American journalist and news executive who served as senior vice president of CNN International. She also worked for the Weather Channel. In 2013, Golden died after a two-year battle with lymphoma.

Early and personal life
She was married to Rob Golden. The couple has a daughter, Sabrina, and a son, Adam. Her sister Uzra Zeya is an American diplomat who serves as Under Secretary of State for Civilian Security, Democracy, and Human Rights in the Biden Administration.

References

External links

2013 deaths
1961 births
American women television journalists
21st-century American women